Extension Ensemble is an American five piece Brass Quintet, based in New York City, composed of Ralph Alessi (trumpet), Sycil Mathai (trumpet), Theo Primis (horn), Mike Boschen (trombone) and Andrew Bove (tuba). They have worked with composers such as Ralph Alessi, Kenji Bunch and Becca Schack and in 2004 released their first album "New York Presence" featuring compositions by artists like Elliot Goldenthal, Moondog (Louis Thomas Hardin) and David Loeb, performed and recorded by the Ensemble.

American classical music groups
Summit Records artists